James Edward Cooney (August 24, 1894 – August 7, 1991), nicknamed "Scoops", was an American shortstop in Major League Baseball who played for six different teams between  and . His father Jimmy Sr. and younger brother Johnny also played in the Major Leagues.

Cooney came back to play once again in the Major Leagues with the St. Louis Cardinals (–), Chicago Cubs (–), Philadelphia Phillies and Boston Braves. His most productive season came in 1924 with St. Louis, when he hit a career-high .295 in 110 games including 20 doubles, eight triples, 57 runs batted in and 12 stolen bases, also career-numbers.

In a seven-season career, Cooney was a .262 hitter (413-for-1575) with two home runs and 150 RBI in 448 games, including 64 doubles, 16 triples, and 30 stolen bases.

Cooney died in Warwick, Rhode Island on August 7, 1991 at the age of 96.

Triple plays

While in Chicago, Cooney entered the record books as the sixth player in the modern era to turn an unassisted triple play. On May 30, 1927, in the fourth inning of a game against Pittsburgh, Cooney caught a line drive hit by  Paul Waner, stepped on second base to retire Lloyd Waner, and then tagged Clyde Barnhart coming down from first base.

One day after Cooney's fielding gem, Johnny Neun also turned an unassisted triple play. Despite their joint fame, Cooney and Neun never actually met, as they were playing in different leagues. (They did face each other in a minor league game in 1929, but didn't exchange words.) Finally, nearly six decades later, in 1986, Sports Illustrated arranged a conference call between the two.

Cooney also had a hand in two more triple plays in his big-league career: first, he was credited with an (assisted) triple play (with Jim Bottomley and Rogers Hornsby) on July 30, 1924. Second, Cooney was called out when Glenn Wright pulled off an unassisted triple play on May 7, 1925. Oddly, it involved the same two men as the previous year's play: Cooney was on second while Hornsby was on first and Bottomley was batting.

See also
List of second generation MLB players
Unassisted triple play

Sources

Jimmy Cooney 1920s shortstop
The Deadball Era

1894 births
1991 deaths
Major League Baseball shortstops
Baseball players from Rhode Island
Boston Red Sox players
New York Giants (NL) players
St. Louis Cardinals players
Chicago Cubs players
Philadelphia Phillies players
Boston Braves players
Minor league baseball managers
Buffalo Bisons (minor league) managers
Sportspeople from Cranston, Rhode Island
Worcester Busters players
Providence Grays (minor league) players
Milwaukee Brewers (minor league) players
Buffalo Bisons (minor league) players